Stralsund (Swedish: Strålsund), officially the Hanseatic City of Stralsund (German: Hansestadt Stralsund), is the fifth-largest city in the northeastern German federal state of Mecklenburg-Western Pomerania after Rostock, Schwerin, Neubrandenburg and Greifswald, and the second-largest city in the Pomeranian part of the state. It is located at the southern coast of the Strelasund, a sound of the Baltic Sea separating the island of Rügen from the Pomeranian mainland.

The Strelasund Crossing with its two bridges and several ferry services connects Stralsund with Rügen, the largest island of Germany and Pomerania. The Western Pomeranian city is the seat of the Vorpommern-Rügen district and, together with Greifswald, Stralsund forms one of four high-level urban centres of the region.

The city's name as well as that of the Strelasund are compounds of the Slavic (Polabian) stral and strela (arrow; Polish: strzała, Czech: střela) and the Germanic sund, a strait or sound. The canting arms of the city make reference to that etymology as well as to Stralsund's Hanseatic past in featuring a silver cross pattée (a Hanseatic Cross) above a silver arrow.

Stralsund was granted city rights in 1234 and is thus the oldest city in Pomerania. It was one of the most prosperous members of the medieval Hanseatic League. In 1628, during the Thirty Years' War, the city came under Swedish rule and remained so until the upheavals of the Napoleonic Wars. It was the capital of Swedish Pomerania (New Western Pomerania) from 1720 to 1815. From 1815 to 1945, Stralsund was part of Prussia.

Stralsund's old town was inscribed as a UNESCO World Heritage Site in 2002 alongside Wismar in Mecklenburg because of its outstanding Brick Gothic buildings and importance during the Hanseatic League and Swedish rule. St Mary's Church has been the tallest church in the world from 1549 to 1569 and from 1573 to 1647. The city's other two large churches are St Nicholas' and St James'. Stralsund is the seat of the German Oceanographic Museum (Deutsches Meeresmuseum) with its satellites Ozeaneum (in Stralsund), Nautineum (on Dänholm Island), and Natureum (on the Fischland-Darß-Zingst Peninsula).

The main industries of Stralsund are shipbuilding, fishing, mechanical engineering, and, to an increasing degree, tourism, life sciences, services and high tech industries, especially information technology and biotechnology.

Geography

Location
The city of Stralsund is located in northeastern Germany in the region of Western Pomerania in the state of Mecklenburg-Vorpommern. Stralsund is located south west of Rügen. It is separated by a small body of water named the Strelasund which stretches out to the Baltic Sea.

Climate
Its annual precipitation is 656 mm (25.8 inches) and comparatively low, falling within the lowest third of all precipitation values in Germany. The driest month is February; the most precipitation falls in July. The precipitation varies relatively moderately throughout the year. Only 40% of weather stations in Germany exhibit lower seasonal variation.

Landscape

The city lies on the sound of Strelasund, a strait of the Baltic Sea. Its geographic proximity to the island of Rügen, whose only fixed link to the mainland, the Strelasund Crossing, runs between Stralsund and the village of Altefähr, has given Stralsund the sobriquet "Gateway to the Island of Rügen" (Tor zur Insel Rügen). Stralsund is located close to the Western Pomerania Lagoon Area National Park.

Stralsund's city borough includes municipal forest and three municipal ponds (the Knieperteich, Frankenteich and Moorteich. The three ponds and the Strelasund lend the Old Town, the original settlement site and historic centre of the city, a protected island ambience. The highest point of the city is the Galgenberg ("Gallows Hill") on its western approaches.

Subdivisions
The city's territory covers an area of 54.07 km2, which makes Stralsund, with its nearly 58,000 inhabitants one of the most densely populated cities in Mecklenburg-Western Pomerania (1,480 inhabitants per km2).

The borough of the Hanseatic city of Stralsund is divided into as follows:

The city also possesses estates in the local area as well as on the islands of Rügen, Hiddensee and Ummanz.

Neighbouring municipalities
Larger cities in the nearby area are Greifswald and Rostock. In the local area around Stralsund there are also the towns of Barth and Ribnitz-Damgarten.

Many of the smaller villages in the vicinity, like Prohn or Negast, have grown sharply after 1990 as a result of the influx of those living or working in Stralsund.

History

In the Middle Ages the Stralsund area formed part of the West Slavic Principality of Rügen. At that time the Dänholm isle and fishing village, both at the site of the latter city, were called Strale or Stralow, Polabian for "arrow" (this meaning underlies the city's coat of arms, which shows an arrow). The full Polabian name can be rendered in Polish as Strzałów.

The village also had a ferry to the island of Rügen. In 1168, following the siege of Arkona, the Principality of Rügen became part of Kingdom of Denmark.

In the course of German Ostsiedlung, many German settlers, gentry and merchants were invited to settle in the principality, and they eventually populated the Strale settlement. Merchants from other countries as well as locals were attracted to the area and made up one third of the settlement's population. The Danish navy used the isle as well. When the settlement had grown to town size, prince Wizlaw I of Rügen granted Lübeck law to "our town Stralow" in 1234, although a significant settlement had existed long before the formal founding. In 1240, when the prince gave additional land to the town, he called it Stralesund.

The success of the settlement challenged the powerful Free City of Lübeck, which burnt Stralsund down in 1249. Afterwards the town was rebuilt with a massive town wall having 11 town gates and 30 watchtowers. The Neustadt, a town-like suburb, had merged with Stralsund by 1361. Schadegard, a nearby twin city to Stralsund also founded by Wizlaw I, though not granted German law, served as the principal stronghold and enclosed a fort. It was given up and torn down by 1269 under pressure from the Stralsund Bürger.

In 1293 Stralsund became a member of the Hanseatic League. A total of 300 ships flying the flag of Stralsund cruised the Baltic Sea in the 14th century. In 1325 the Principality of Rügen became part of the Duchy of Pomerania, Stralsund however maintained a considerable independence.

In the 17th century opposing forces in the Thirty Years' War fought over Stralsund. In the Battle of Stralsund (1628), the Imperial (Catholic) forces commanded by Albrecht von Wallenstein besieged the city after the council refused to accept the Capitulation of Franzburg of November 1627. Stralsund resisted with Danish and Swedish support. The Swedish garrison in Stralsund was the first on German soil in history. With the Treaty of Stettin (1630), the city became one of two major Swedish forts in the Duchy of Pomerania, alongside Stettin (now Szczecin, Poland).

After the war, the Peace of Westphalia (1648) and the Treaty of Stettin (1653) made Stralsund part of Swedish Pomerania. Lost to Brandenburg in the Battle of Stralsund (1678), it reverted to Sweden in the Treaty of Saint-Germain-en-Laye (1679). In the Great Northern War in 1715 Charles XII led the defence of Stralsund for a year against the united European armies. Stralsund remained under Swedish control until the Battle of Stralsund (1807), when Napoleon Bonaparte's army occupied it. Seized by Ferdinand von Schill's freikorps in 1809, it subsequently reverted to French control, with Schill killed in action. With the Congress of Vienna (1815), Stralsund became a part of the Prussian Province of Pomerania and the seat of a government region resembling the former Swedish Pomerania.

Following the First World War Stralsund suffered the same sort of political unrest and unemployment that afflicted much of Germany. In May 1919 Stralsund workers clashed with police, and martial law was declared. In the early 1920s the Independent Social Democratic Party (USPD) became the strongest party in Stralsund, but its political fortunes waned rapidly, and in September 1922 it reunited with the Social Democratic Party (SPD).

In the national parliamentary election of May 1924, the conservative German National People's Party (DNVP) polled 8,547 votes in Stralsund, the SPD 3,534, the Communists 1,825 and the German People's Party (DVP) of Foreign Minister Gustav Stresemann 1,417. However, in keeping with national trends, Hitler's National Socialists made rapid gains in the late 1920s, and by the time of the last free national election in July 1932 the Nazis polled twice as many votes in Stralsund as the SPD.

During the Nazi period (1933–1945), Stralsund's military installations expanded, and a naval training base opened on the nearby island of Dänholm. In World War II the city was subjected to repeated Allied bombing. Attacks by the U.S. Army Air Forces in 1944 killed some 800 Stralsunders and destroyed an estimated 8,000 dwellings. The 354th Rifle Division of the Red Army occupied Stralsund on April 28, 1945 – 10 days before the end of the war in Europe. Approximately half its population had fled.

During the period of the German Democratic Republic (GDR), Stralsund saw the construction of numerous Plattenbau prefabricated apartment blocks. Its economic life centered on the now state-owned shipyard, which largely focussed on building ships for the Soviet Union.

After German reunification in 1990, the city's historic old town was thoroughly restored, and Communist-era apartment blocks were renovated and upgraded. In 2002 the old towns of Stralsund and Wismar, some 120 km to the west, were listed as UNESCO World Heritage Sites. Stralsund's shipyard was privatized, and thereafter specialized in constructing container ships.

Culture and sights

Main sights
 The historic Stralsund old town island is a UNESCO World Heritage Site. It features many valuable remnants of the Hanseatic time, Brick Gothic, renaissance, baroque, historicist and Jugendstil buildings.
 The heart of the old town is the Alter Markt Square ("Old Market"), with the Gothic city hall (13th century). Behind the city hall soars the imposing St. Nicholas' Church, built in 1270–1360. The square is surrounded by houses from different periods, including the Gothic Wulflamhaus (a 14th-century patrician house, today a restaurant), and the Baroque Commandantenhus of 1751, the old headquarters of the Swedish military commander.
 Saint James' Church, built in mid-14th century. It was destroyed several times, e.g. by Wallenstein and in World War II.
 Saint Mary's Church, built in 1383–1473 in Gothic style, is the largest church in Stralsund, and from 1625 to 1647 it was the world's tallest structure. Its octagonal tower (104 meters high) offers a panorama view of Stralsund and the neighboring islands of Rügen and Hiddensee.

 St. John's Abbey (Franciscan monastery built in 1254) is one of the oldest buildings in the city.
 Stralsund is the port of registry for the former German Reichsmarine Navy Sail Training ship "Gorch Fock" 1. It is now a floating museum.
 The Monastery of Saint Catherine, mainly built in the 15th century, houses two museums today: Stralsund's Museum of Cultural History (known for e.g. the Gold Jewellery of Hiddensee), and the German Oceanographic Museum, Germany's largest aquarium and oceanographic collection. The ancient refectory of the monastery is one of the most spectacular Gothic interiors in Germany.
 Besides the mentioned German Oceanographic Museum at the Katharinenkloster, Stralsund has other museums dedicated to marine life, including the popular Ozeaneum that was voted European Museum of the Year in 2010. There is also a nautical centre, the Nautineum, on Dänholm island and the Marinemuseum Dänholm, showcasing the military history of the German Navy, especially the interwar Reichsmarine. It also hosts one of the last remaining GDR Volksmarine (People's Navy) torpedo boats.

Buildings and monuments

Old Town (Altstadt)
The centre of Stralsund has a wealth of historic buildings. Since 1990, large parts of the historic old town have been renovated with private and public capital, and with the support of foundations. As a result of the contempt for historic buildings in East Germany many houses were threatened by ruin. The Old Town in particular offers a rich variety of historic buildings, with many former merchants' houses, churches, streets and squares. Of more than 800 listed buildings in Stralsund, more than 500 are designated as individual monuments in the Old Town. In twenty years, from the Wende (turning point) in 1990 to November 2010, 588 of the more than 1,000 old buildings were completely refurbished, including 363 individual monuments. Because of its historical and architectural significance, in 2002 Stralsund's old town together with the old town of Wismar were added to entitled the UNESCO World Cultural Heritage list as the "Historic Centres of Stralsund and Wismar".
Alter Markt Square
On the Alter Markt Square there is the main landmark of Stralsund: the Brick Gothic city hall from Hanseatic times. This building from 1278 features a remarkable "show façade" that serves the sole purpose of displaying wealth of the city. Citizens can walk through the city hall and its gallery. It also features one of Europe's largest Gothic cellar vaults. The ensemble of buildings on the Alter Markt Square includes the St. Nicholas Church, the Artushof, the Wulflamhaus, the Commandantenhus, the Gewerkschaftshaus and a new apartment complex. 
Old Town houses
The historic houses with their distinctive gables, often renovated at a high financial cost, dominate the scene in the streets of the Old Town. The former Swedish Government Palace is now home to the city construction department. The Museum of Cultural History Museum in Mönchstrasse, in one of the most important surviving original houses of the Hanseatic era, was refurbished with funds from the German Foundation for Monument Conservation It offers a guide to understanding the city's history over seven centuries.

Churches
Three large medieval Brick Gothic buildings – St. Mary's Church, St. Nicholas Church and St. James Church, point to the medieval significance of Stralsund. Today St. James' is used purely as a cultural venue, its parish being served now by the Church of the Holy Spirit, which also dates from the 14th century. Two other churches on the Alter Markt Square and the Neuer Markt are still used for church services. The tower of St. Mary's on the Neuer Markt offers a panoramic view over Stralsund and the island of Rügen. 
Monasteries
St. John's Abbey, a Franciscan monastery from 1254, now houses the Stralsund City Archives. Regular cultural events also take place here, such as open-air theatre productions.

The Gothic abbey of St. Anne and St. Bridget in Schillstrasse was established around 1560 from the merger of the abbey of St. Anne (1480) and the double abbey of Mariakron (1421).

The Abbey of St. Jürgen on Mönchstrasse was mentioned in 1278 for the first time. It served in the 14th century as an old people's home. In 1743 a new building, the Kleines St. Jürgen Kloster, was built at Kniepertor and the site was extended in 1754 to create old people's flats and in 1841 for widow's apartments.

First mentioned in 1256, the Heilgeistkloster is now the Hospital of the Holy Spirit.

Port
Ferries to Hiddensee and Altefähr, as well as harbor tour boats, dock at the port. In the summer months the port is a berthing places for river cruisers. There are several yacht harbors and marinas near the Old Town. Hundreds of yachts and boats tie up along the north mole in summer. Architecturally the pilot station and the harbor warehouse (Hafenspeicher), as well as the silhouette of the Old Town, form a unique tableau of different historical eras. The barque and former sailor's training ship, Gorch Fock is another tourist attraction at the harbor.

Education

The Fachhochschule Stralsund is a University of Applied Sciences with a modern campus, north of the old town at the Strelasund. It has around 2,500 students and is among the best ranked public universities in Germany in various fields, especially in economics. Other university departments are Mechanical Engineering, Electrical Engineering and Information Technology. The FH Stralsund also offers international study programs, such as Leisure and Tourism Management and Baltic Management Studies (international business management).

Transport
Stralsund is linked to the A20 motorway (towards Berlin and Hamburg), via the B96n dual-carriageway. Other major roads include the B105 (beginning in the city centre and continuing to Rostock) and the B96 (major road to Rügen) and the B194 to the town of Grimmen.

Stralsund Hauptbahnhof is on the line to Berlin, Rostock, Pasewalk and Bergen.

When travelling by air, passengers usually do so via Rostock-Laage Airport with connecting flights from Munich. A small airport, Stralsund Barth Airport, also serves the city locally.

City buses are run by SWS (Stadtwerke Stralsund).

Twin towns – sister cities

Stralsund is twinned with:

 Huangshan, China
 Kiel, Germany
 Malmö, Sweden
 Pori, Finland
 Stargard, Poland
 Svendborg, Denmark
 Trelleborg, Sweden
 Ventspils, Latvia

Notable people

Public service and commerce 
Thomas Kantzow (c.1505–1542), chronicler of the Duchy of Pomerania
Bartholomäus Sastrow (1520–1603), official, notary and mayor of Stralsund
Nicodemus Tessin the Elder (1615–1681), Swedish architect
Carl Gustav Rehnskiöld (1651–1722), Swedish Field Marshal
Philip Johan von Strahlenberg (1676–1747), Swedish officer and geographer
Ernst Moritz Arndt (1769–1860), nationalist author, poet, fighter against serfdom.
Ferdinand von Schill (1776–1809), leader of a revolt against French domination.
Carl Georg Schwing (1778—1858), jurist and mayor of Stralsund
Georg Friedrich Schömann (1793–1879), classical scholar.
Arnold Ruge (1802–1880), philosopher and political writer.
Adolf Heinrich von Arnim-Boitzenburg (1803–1868), Prime minister of Prussia
Hermann von Mallinckrodt (1821–1874), parliamentarian from the Province of Westphalia
Eduard von Jachmann (1822–1887), vice admiral of the Prussian Navy
Erich Haupt (1841–1910), Lutheran theologian
Leonhard Tietz (1849–1914), merchant, opened his first department store in Stralsund in 1879
Georg Wertheim (1857–1939), merchant, founded the Wertheim chain of department stores
Johannes Kromayer (1859–1934), classical historian
Wolfram Setz (born 1941), historian, editor and translator
Angela Merkel (born 1954), politician; her office is still located on the main shopping street
Dietmar Bartsch (born 1958), politician, member of the Bundestag

Science 

Carl Wilhelm Scheele (1742–1786), Swedish Pomeranian / German pharmaceutical chemist.
Christian Ehrenfried Weigel (1748–1831), scientist
Hermann Burmeister (1807–1892), German-Argentine zoologist, entomologist and botanist 
William Lindley (1808–1900), engineer, designed water and sewerage systems
Wilhelm Ferdinand Erichson (1809–1848), medical doctor and entomologist
Otto Gottlieb Mohnike (1814–1887), physician and naturalist
Gustav Karl Wilhelm Hermann Karsten (1817–1908), botanist and geologist
Ernst Kromayer (1862–1933), dermatologist and inventor
Karl Grunberg (1875–1932), otologist

The Arts 

 Hermann Raupach (1728–1778), composer
 Paul Struck (1776–1820), composer
 Joachim Nicolas Eggert (1779–1813), Swedish composer and musical director
 Joachim Daniel Andreas Müller (1812–1857), Swedish gardener and writer
 Heinrich Kruse (1815–1902), dramatist, publicist and playwright 
 Friedrich Spielhagen (1829–1911), novelist, literary theorist and translator.
 Hermann Carl Hempel (1848–1921), landscape painter
 Hans-Heinz Dräger (1909–1963), German-American musicologist
 Harry Kupfer (1935–2019), opera director, worked at the Stralsund Theatre 1958–1962
 Nadja Uhl (born 1972), actress

Sport 
Olaf von Schilling (born 1943), swimmer
Helmut Losch (1947–2005), weightlifter
Jürgen Heuser (born 1953), weightlifter, Olympic medalist
Monika Kallies (born 1956), rower, Olympic winner
Silke Möller (born 1964), athlete
Carsten Embach (born 1968), bobsledder
Ulrike Maisch (born 1977), long-distance runner
Eric Koreng (born 1981), beach volleyball player

Gallery

See also
Stralsunder Highflier

References

Further reference
Britannica Online Encyclopedia, "Stralsund" (city), 2007, webpage: EB-Stralsund.

Literature
 Gustav Kratz: Die Städte der Provinz Pommern – Abriss ihrer Geschichte, zumeist nach Urkunden. Berlin 1865,  ( Volltext)
 Auerbach, Horst: Festung und Marinegarnison Stralsund. Hinstorff-Verlag, Rostock 1999, .
 Detlev Brunner: Stralsund – Eine Stadt im Systemwandel vom Ende des Kaiserreichs bis in die 1960er Jahre. Veröffentlichungen zur SBZ-/DDR-Forschung im Institut für Zeitgeschichte. München 2010, . (Rezension)
 Hansestadt Stralsund, Untere Denkmalschutzbehörde (ed.): Denkmalplan Stralsund. Recherchen und Analysen für die Pflege des Welterbes. Thomas Helms Verlag, Schwerin 2013. .

External links

The "Stralsund Expedition" of 1715, depicted in Thomas Carlyle's "History Of Friedrich II of Prussia"

 
Members of the Hanseatic League
Port cities and towns in Germany
Port cities and towns of the Baltic Sea
Marinas in Germany
Landmarks in Germany
World Heritage Sites in Germany
Populated coastal places in Germany (Baltic Sea)